GIPF may refer to:

 The GIPF Project, comprising seven abstract strategy board games by Kris Burm
 GIPF (game), the first and central game of the GIPF Project
 Government Institutions Pension Fund (Namibia)